Bitter Sweet is the second and final album by the English band King, produced by Richard James Burgess and released by CBS Records in 1985. The album peaked at number 16 in the UK Album Chart and was certified Gold by the BPI.

The first single from the album was "Alone Without You" which reached the UK Top 10. Two further singles were taken from the album, "The Taste of Your Tears" (UK #11) and "Torture" (UK #23).

The cassette edition of the record featured a slightly different track listing, containing a slow reprise of the first single "Alone Without You", and the 12" extended remix replacing the 7" version of "The Taste of Your Tears".

The original 1985 CD edition (made in Japan for Europe) also has a different track order and features remixes of the 2 singles "Torture" and "The Taste of Your Tears" instead of the album versions of these songs.

The 1985 CD release in Japan and all digital versions sold online follow the original LP track listing.

In September 2007, the album was remastered and re-released on CD by Cherry Red label with eight bonus tracks including remixes and B-sides.

Track listing

LP & Japanese CD
"Alone Without You" – 3:35 (P. King)
"Platform One" – 3:05 (P. King)
"I Cringed, I Died, I Felt Hot" – 4:56 (P. King/M. Roberts)
"(KFAD) Wait for No-One" – 3:37 (P. King/M. Roberts/J. Lantsbery/A. Wall)
"2 M.B." – 3:38 (P. King)
"These Things" – 4:34 (P. King/M. Roberts)
"The Taste of Your Tears" – 4:03 (P. King)
"Torture" – 4:29 (P. King)
"Sugar Candy Mountain Buddhas" – 3:51 (P. King/A. Wall/J. Lantsbery)
"Mind Yer Toes" – 4:07 (P. King)

MC
"Alone Without You" (3:38)
"Platform One" (3:07)
"I Cringed, I Died, I Felt Hot" (4:58)
"(KFAD) Wait for No-One" (3:39)
"2 M.B." (3:50)
"Alone Without You – The Reprise" (3:23)
"These Things" (4:37)
"The Taste of Your Tears (Breaker Heart Mix)" (5:42)
"Torture" (4:29)
"Sugar Candy Mountain Buddhas" (3:54)
"Mind Yer Toes" (4:11)

CD 1985
"Alone Without You" (3:38)
"Platform One" (3:07)
"I Cringed, I Died, I Felt Hot" (4:58)
"Torture (Passion Fruit Mix)" (6:45)
"2 M.B." (3:50)
"These Things" (4:37)
"The Taste of Your Tears (Breaker Heart Mix)" (5:40)
"(KFAD) Wait for No-One" (3:39)
"Sugar Candy Mountain Buddhas" (3:54)
"Mind Yer Toes" (4:11)

CD remaster 2007
"Alone Without You" (3:38)
"Platform One" (3:07)
"I Cringed, I Died, I Felt Hot" (4:58)
"(KFAD) Wait for No-One" (3:39)
"2 M.B." (3:50)
"These Things" (4:37)
"The Taste of Your Tears" (4:05)
"Torture" (4:29)
"Sugar Candy Mountain Buddhas" (3:54)
"Mind Yer Toes" (4:11)
"Crazy Party" (3:26)
"Alone Without You (Scorcher Mix)" (4:30)
"The Taste of Your Tears (Breaker Heart CD Mix)" (5:42)
"Torture (Passion Fruit Mix)" (6:43)
"Love & Pride (USA Summer Mix)" (6:17)
"I Kissed the Spikey Fridge (Rock Hard Mix)" (4:02)
"These Things (Reprise)" (2:30)
"Alone Without You – The Reprise" (3:23)

Singles
1985 – "Alone Without You" (UK #8)
1985 – "The Taste of Your Tears" (UK #11)
1986 – "Torture" (UK #23)

Personnel
Paul King – vocals
Mick Roberts – keyboards
Anthony "Tony" Wall – bass guitar
Jim "Jackal" Lantsbery – guitar
Adrian Lillywhite – drums

Production and design
Richard James Burgess – producer
Phill Brown – engineering, mixing
Perry Haines – photography
Rob O'Connor  – photography
James Palmer  – photography
Jeff Veitch – photography
Simon Fowler – sleeve photography
Rob O'Connor – design

Release history

References

External links
Discogs: track listing, credits, timings, label, date of vinyl LP edition
Discogs: track listing, credits, timings, label, date of remastered CD edition

1985 albums
King (band) albums
Albums produced by Richard James Burgess